Caleb Hamilton (born February 5, 1995) is an American professional baseball catcher in the Boston Red Sox organization. He has previously played in Major League Baseball (MLB) for the Minnesota Twins.

Amateur career
A native of Woodinville, Washington, Hamilton graduated from Woodinville High School then attended Oregon State University. In three seasons with the Beavers college baseball team (2014–2016), Hamilton had a .223 batting average with six home runs and 53 runs batted in (RBIs) in 149 games. In 2015, he played collegiate summer baseball with the Falmouth Commodores of the Cape Cod Baseball League, batting .193 in 28 games.

Professional career

Minnesota Twins
Hamilton was selected by the Minnesota Twins in the 23rd round of the 2016 MLB draft. He made his professional debut that season and advanced through the Twins' farm system, first reaching the Triple-A level in 2019. After the 2020 minor-league season was canceled, Hamilton spent 2021 with the Wichita Wind Surge of Double-A and the St. Paul Saints of Triple-A, registering an overall .224 batting average with seven home runs and 42 RBIs in 99 games.

In 2022, Hamilton returned to St. Paul to start the season, then was called up by the Twins and made his MLB debut on July 17. In 22 major-league games with Minnesota, he batted .056 with his only hit in 18 at bats being a home run. He also appeared in 62 games with St. Paul, batting .233 with 11 home runs and 43 RBIs.

Boston Red Sox
On October 11, 2022, Hamilton was claimed off waivers by the Boston Red Sox. On November 15, he was designated for assignment.

References

External links

1995 births
Living people
People from Woodinville, Washington
Baseball players from Washington (state)
Major League Baseball catchers
Minnesota Twins players
Oregon State Beavers baseball players
Falmouth Commodores players
Cedar Rapids Kernels players
Elizabethton Twins players
Fort Myers Miracle players
Pensacola Blue Wahoos players
Rochester Red Wings players
St. Paul Saints players
Wichita Wind Surge players